Leonardo Vaca Gutiérrez (born November 24, 1995) is a Bolivian  football striker currently playing for FK Žalgiris in the A lyga.

International career
Vaca was summoned to the Bolivian U-20 team to play in the 2015 South American Youth Football Championship.

He was named in Bolivia's senior squad for a 2018 FIFA World Cup qualifier against Colombia in March 2016.

International goals
Scores and results list Bolivia's goal tally first.

References

External links
 
 Soccerpunter profile

1995 births
Living people
Bolivian footballers
Bolivian Primera División players
Club Blooming players
Sport Boys Warnes players
Club Bolívar players
Association football forwards
2019 Copa América players
Bolivia youth international footballers
Sportspeople from Santa Cruz de la Sierra
Bolivia international footballers